A Spark of Light is a 2018 contemporary novel by American writer Jodi Picoult.  The plot of the book surrounds a shooting in a women's health clinic in Mississippi. A police negotiator bargains for the release of hostages including his teenage daughter. The book focuses on the father-daughter dynamic and the issue of abortion.

References

2018 American novels
Novels by Jodi Picoult
Ballantine Books books
Hodder & Stoughton books
Allen & Unwin books